La Pandera (altitude ) is a mountain and the highest point of the Sierra Sur de Jaén mountain range in the Province of Jaén, Spain. There is a military station at the summit.

Sport

Cycling
The Vuelta a España has had a stage finish, at the summit of La Pandera, on several occasions.

References

External links

La Pandera at Altimetrias.net
Alto de la Pandera at Ciclistas.org (archive.org)

Mountains of Spain
Baetic System
Geography of the Province of Jaén (Spain)